The CEV qualification for the 2018 FIVB Volleyball Men's World Championship saw member nations compete for seven places at the finals in Italy and Bulgaria.

Pools composition
39 CEV national teams entered qualification.

First round
7 Small Countries Division teams participated in the first round. The first round also acted as the 2017 European Championship Small Countries Division qualification round. Teams were seeded following the serpentine system according to their final ranking of 2015 European Championship Small Countries Division. But, Northern Ireland and Iceland were switched between the pools as Iceland were drawn as the 2nd hosts alongside Luxembourg who applied to hosts. Rankings are shown in brackets.

Second round
The six hosts were drawn as heads of series in one of the six pools (from left to right, A–B–C–D–E–F). The remaining participating teams were grouped in five sub-groups – each one including six teams – according to the CEV National Team Ranking as of 19 October 2015 – i.e. when National Federations registered for participation in the World Championship qualification – and drawn accordingly into one of the six pools (from left to right, A–B–C–D–E–F). Rankings are shown in brackets except hosts. The pools were confirmed on 26 October 2016.

Third round

Pool standing procedure
 Number of matches won
 Match points
 Sets ratio
 Points ratio
 If the tie continues as per the point ratio between two teams, the priority will be given to the team which won the last match between them. When the tie in points ratio is between three or more teams, a new classification of these teams in the terms of points 1, 2 and 3 will be made taking into consideration only the matches in which they were opposed to each other.

Match won 3–0 or 3–1: 3 match points for the winner, 0 match points for the loser
Match won 3–2: 2 match points for the winner, 1 match point for the loser

First round
The top two teams in each pool qualified for the second round.

Pool A
Venue:  d'Coque Gymnase, Luxembourg City, Luxembourg
Dates: 13–15 May 2016
All times are Central European Summer Time (UTC+02:00).

|}

|}

Pool B
Venue:  Laugardalshöll, Reykjavík, Iceland
Dates: 20–22 May 2016
All times are Western European Time (UTC±00:00).

|}

|}

Second round
The winners in each pool qualified for the 2018 World Championship, whereas the runners-up in each pool qualified for the third round.

Pool A
Venue:  Palais des Sports de Gerland, Lyon, France
Dates: 24–28 May 2017
All times are Central European Summer Time (UTC+02:00).

|}

|}

Pool B
Dates: 23–28 May 2017
All times are Central European Summer Time (UTC+02:00).

|}

Venue:  Topsportcentrum de Koog, Koog aan de Zaan, Netherlands

|}

Venue:  Omnisport Apeldoorn Volleyball Hall, Apeldoorn, Netherlands

|}

Pool C
Venue:  Arena Stožice, Ljubljana, Slovenia
Dates: 24–28 May 2017
All times are Central European Summer Time (UTC+02:00).

|}

|}

Pool D
Venue:  Kalevi Spordihall, Tallinn, Estonia
Dates: 24–28 May 2017
All times are Eastern European Summer Time (UTC+03:00).

|}

|}

Pool E
Venue:  Dom odbojke Bojan Stranic, Zagreb, Croatia
Dates: 24–28 May 2017
All times are Central European Summer Time (UTC+02:00).

|}

|}

Pool F
Venue:  KV Arena Ball Sports Hall, Karlovy Vary, Czech Republic
Dates: 24–28 May 2017
All times are Central European Summer Time (UTC+02:00).

|}

|}

Third round
The winners qualified for the 2018 World Championship.

Pool G
Venue:  Sportcampus Lange Munte, Kortrijk, Belgium
Dates: 19–23 July 2017
All times are Central European Summer Time (UTC+02:00).

|}

|}

References

External links
Official website

2018 FIVB Volleyball Men's World Championship
2016 in volleyball
2017 in men's volleyball